2062 Aten , provisional designation , is a stony sub-kilometer asteroid and namesake of the Aten asteroids, a subgroup of near-Earth objects. The asteroid was named after Aten from Egyptian mythology.

It was discovered on 7 January 1976, at the Palomar Observatory by American astronomer Eleanor Helin, who was the principal scientist for the NEAT project until her retirement in 2002. The S-type asteroid measures approximately 900 meters in diameter, has a longer-than average rotation period of 44.77 hours, and approaches the orbit Earth to 44.1 lunar distances.

Orbit and classification 

Aten orbits the Sun at a distance of 0.8–1.1 AU once every 11 months (347 days). Its orbit has an eccentricity of 0.18 and an inclination of 19° with respect to the ecliptic. A first precovery was taken at the discovering observatory in December 1955, extending the body's observation arc by more than 20 years prior to its official discovery observation.

Namesake of the Aten group 

Aten was the first asteroid found to have a semi-major orbital axis of less than one astronomical unit and a period of less than one year. A new category of asteroids was thus created, the Atens. As of 2017, the group consists of more than 1,200 numbered members. Other groups of near-Earth objects (NEOs) are the Apollo and Amor asteroids, which are both significantly larger than the Atens, while the Atira asteroids form the smallest NEO-group by far.

Close approaches 

Physical characteristics 

In the Tholen classification, Aten is a common S-type asteroid. In the SMASS taxonomy it is classified as an Sr-type, a subtype which transitions to the R-type asteroids.

Lightcurve 

In the 1990s, Italian astronomer Stefano Mottola obtained a rotational lightcurve of Aten during the EUNEASO survey at La Silla, which was a European near-Earth object search and follow-up observation program to determine additional physical parameters. Lightcurve analysis gave a longer-than average rotation period of 40.77 hours with a brightness variation of 0.26 magnitude. No additional lightcurves have been obtained since.

Diameter and albedo 

According to the survey carried out by NASA's Wide-field Infrared Survey Explorer with its subsequent NEOWISE mission, Aten measures between 700 and 830 meters in diameter and its surface has a high albedo between 0.39 and 0.52.

in 1994, Tom Gehrels published a diameter of 1.1 kilometers and an albedo of 0.26 in his book Hazards Due to Comets and Asteroids. The Warm Spitzer NEO survey ("ExploreNEOs") gives a diameter of 1.3 kilometers with an albedo of 0.20.

The Collaborative Asteroid Lightcurve Link agrees with a revised thermal model for asteroid diameters and albedos, and adopts an albedo of 0.28 with a diameter of 0.91 kilometers based on an absolute magnitude of 17.2. However, the Minor Planet Center (MPC) classifies Aten as a larger "1+ KM" object.

Naming 

This minor planet was named from Egyptian mythology after Aten, the ancient Egyptian god of the solar disk, originally an aspect of the god Ra. The official  was published by the Minor Planet Center on 1 August 1978.

Notes

References

External links 
 Benner, et al. - Radar Detection of Near-Earth Asteroids 2062 Aten, 2101 Adonis, 3103 Eger, 4544 Xanthus, and 1992 QN (1997)
 Asteroid Lightcurve Database (LCDB), query form (info )
 Dictionary of Minor Planet Names, Google books
 Asteroids and comets rotation curves, CdR – Observatoire de Genève, Raoul Behrend
 
 
 

002062
Discoveries by Eleanor F. Helin
Named minor planets
Earth-crossing asteroids
002062
002062
19760107